Oleg Anatolyevich Salenko (born 25 October 1969) is a Russian-Ukrainian former footballer who played as a forward. He scored a record five goals in a group-stage match in the 1994 World Cup, helping him earn the Golden Boot as joint-top tournament goalscorer.

Club career

Salenko was born to a Ukrainian father and a Russian mother in Leningrad, Russian SFSR, Soviet Union. He played for Zenit Leningrad, Dynamo Kyiv, Logroñés, Córdoba, Valencia, Rangers and İstanbulspor during his club career, that lasted from 1986 to 2000.

Eventually, he faded from the international football scene and finally had to end his career prematurely, at the age of 31, for health reasons stemming from injuries. Salenko returned to playing professional football in the 2000–01 season and signed for Pogoń Szczecin. He retired after playing a single game however due to his physical conditioning.

International career
Salenko played for the Soviet Union under-20 team at the 1989 FIFA World Youth Championship, becoming the tournament top scorer with 5 goals. He played a total of only nine international matches, including the Ukraine 1–3 Hungary friendly, which was the first international game for the Ukraine national football team to be recognised by FIFA. He also had eight appearances for Russia and scored six goals, all of them at the World Cup in which he was joint top scorer. His last international appearance was 6–1 win against Cameroon when he scored five times.

As of 2022, he is the only player to win the Golden Boot at both the U-20 World Cup and FIFA World Cup.

1994 FIFA World Cup
Salenko set a World Cup record by scoring five goals in one game in Russia's 6–1 win against Cameroon on 28 June 1994. He finished the 1994 World Cup with six goals, having scored from the penalty spot against Sweden in the previous match and shared the Golden Boot with Bulgarian Hristo Stoichkov after being knocked out in the first round and having played only three matches while Bulgaria played a total of seven matches and achieved a fourth-place finish. As of 2022, Salenko is the only player ever to win the Golden Boot award on a team eliminated from the World Cup finals at the group stage.

Beach football
In 2003, Salenko was appointed as manager of the Ukraine national beach soccer team. His team played three games, the only win being over USA 6–5, and losing the other two to Brazil and Spain. The tournament took place at the end of July in Portugal under the name Mundialito. After the tournament, he was dismissed. He was later taking part of FFU assisting staff, but later stopped involving in football to focus on his business.

Career statistics

International
Appearances and goals by national team and year

International goals
Scores and results list Russia's goal tally first.

Honours
Dynamo Kyiv
Soviet Top League: 1990
Soviet Cup: 1990
Individual
FIFA World Youth Championship Golden Shoe: 1989
FIFA World Cup Golden Boot: 1994

References

External links
 
 RSSSF
 Player profile 
 
 

1969 births
Living people
Russian emigrants to Ukraine
Footballers from Saint Petersburg
Association football forwards
Soviet footballers
Russian footballers
Ukrainian footballers
Soviet Top League players
Scottish Football League players
Rangers F.C. players
Ukrainian Premier League players
FC Dynamo Kyiv players
FC Zenit Saint Petersburg players
Ekstraklasa players
Pogoń Szczecin players
La Liga players
Segunda División players
Valencia CF players
CD Logroñés footballers
Córdoba CF players
İstanbulspor footballers
Süper Lig players
1994 FIFA World Cup players
Soviet Union under-21 international footballers
Ukraine international footballers
Russia international footballers
Russian expatriate footballers
Russian expatriate sportspeople in Spain
Russian expatriate sportspeople in Turkey
Russian people of Ukrainian descent
Ukrainian expatriate footballers
Expatriate footballers in Spain
Expatriate footballers in Scotland
Expatriate footballers in Turkey
Expatriate footballers in Poland
Dual internationalists (football)
Ukrainian expatriate sportspeople in Spain
Russian expatriate sportspeople in Scotland
Russian expatriate sportspeople in Poland
Russian expatriate football managers